Pea Patch, Peapatch and P-Patch may refer to:
Peapatch, Virginia
Peapatch, West Virginia
Pea Patch Island
P-Patch, community garden plots in Seattle